Leonardo Náuhmitl López Luján (born 31 March 1964 in Mexico City) is an archaeologist and one of the leading researchers of pre-Hispanic Central Mexican societies and the history of archaeology in Mexico. He is director of the Templo Mayor Project in Mexico's National Institute of Anthropology and History (INAH) since 1991 and son of renowned historian Alfredo López Austin. He is fellow of El Colegio Nacional, the British Academy, the Society of Antiquaries of London, the Real Academia de la Historia in Madrid, the American Academy of Arts & Sciences, and the Académie des Inscriptions et Belles-Lettres in Paris.

Education and professional life
López Luján received his bachelor's degree in archaeology from Mexico's National School of Anthropology and History (ENAH), which he attended from 1983 to 1987 as a student of Eduardo Matos Moctezuma, who directed his thesis on the Offerings of the Templo Mayor of Tenochtitlan (1990). In 1992 he pursued doctoral studies at the Paris Nanterre University as a student of Jean-Claude Gardin, Michel Graulich, and Alain Schnapp. His dissertation, "Anthropologie religieuse du Templo Mayor, Mexico: La Maison des Aigles" (The Religious Anthropology of the Templo Mayor, Mexico: The House of Eagles), presented in 1998 under the direction of Pierre Becquelin and Michel Graulich, obtained the highest honors.

During his academic career he has been a visiting research fellow at Princeton University (1995), the Musée de l'Homme in Paris (2002), Harvard University's Dumbarton Oaks (2006), and the Institut d'Études Avancées from Paris (2013-2014), and a visiting professor at the University of Paris I Panthéon-Sorbonne (2000), the University of Rome–La Sapienza (2004 and 2016), the École Pratique des Hautes Études in Paris (2011), and Francisco Marroquín University in Guatemala (2011).

In INAH, he has been a full-time research professor at the Templo Mayor Museum since 1988 and part-time teaching professor at the National School of Conservation, Restoration, and Museography (ENCRYM) since 2000.

He was president of the Mexican Society of Anthropology from 2003 to 2005 and has been a member of the administration council of the Société des Américanistes since 1999. He is currently a Level III Researcher in Mexico's National System of Researchers (SNI) and member of the Mexican Academy of Sciences, and the Mexican Academy of History.

In recent times López Luján has been elected as a corresponding fellow of the British Academy (FBA), as an honorary fellow of the Society of Antiquaries of London (Hon FSA), as a foreign corresponding fellow of the Real Academia de la Historia in Madrid, as a honorary international fellow of the American Academy of Arts & Sciences, and as a foreign corresponding fellow of the 
Académie des Inscriptions et Belles-Lettres in Paris, recognizing his contributions to the field of Mesoamerican research.

On November 5, 2018, López Luján was elected new member of El Colegio Nacional (The National College), a Mexican honorary academy that brings together the country's forty foremost artists and scientists.

Research, fieldwork and museum exhibitions
His research has focused primarily on the religion, politics, and art of pre-Hispanic societies in Central Mexico. His scholarship has contributed to our knowledge of indigenous strategies of recovering the distant past, the coded language of buried offerings, the conceptualization of animals as cosmic emblems, the functions and symbolism of sacred architecture, the uses and meanings of Mexica sculpture, the application of materials science to the study of pre-Hispanic art and artifacts, iconoclastic activities in times of crisis, mother goddess cults, and sacrificial practices, among other areas. He has also ventured into the history of Mexican archaeology, achieving significant advances in the study of its origins in the eighteenth and nineteenth centuries.

López Luján began working in archeological, anthropological, and historical projects when he was eight years old. He has participated in various scientific teams in the Mexican federal entities of Campeche, Chiapas, Distrito Federal, Guanajuato, Estado de México, Morelos, and Quintana Roo, and in Ecuador.

The year 1980 was especially significant in his career, for he began working at INAH's Templo Mayor Project in the first (1978–1982) and second (1987) seasons of excavations in Tenochtitlan's sacred precinct under the direction of Eduardo Matos Moctezuma. Eleven years later, in 1991, he became the director of the project and currently occupies this position. In this way, he has led the fourth (1991–1992), fifth (1994–1997), sixth (2004–2006), seventh (2007–2014), eighth (2014–2018), and ninth (2018– ) archaeological field seasons.

As part of his research at the archaeological site of Teotihuacan, he co-directed with William L. Fash and Linda Manzanilla the Xalla Palace excavation project and also worked with Saburo Sugiyama and Rubén Cabrera on the Pyramid of the Moon Project.

His own projects have been funded by INAH, the University of Colorado at Boulder, the University of Texas at Austin, Princeton University, and Harvard University.

With renowned colleagues he has curated major exhibitions, including "The Aztec World" at the Field Museum in Chicago, "Moctezuma: Aztec Ruler" at the British Museum in London,
"El capitán Dupaix y su álbum arqueológico de 1794" (Captain Dupaix and his 1794 archaeological album) at the National Museum of Anthropology in Mexico City, as well as "Camino al Mictlan" (The Way to the Land of the Dead), "La Casa de las Águilas" (The House of Eagles), "Sacrificios de consagración en la Pirámide de la Luna" (Consecration Sacrifices at the Pyramid of the Moon), "Humo aromático para los dioses" (Aromatic Smoke for the Gods), and "Nuestra sangre, nuestro color: la escultura polícroma de Tenochtitlan (Our Blood, Our Color: Tenochtitlan's polychromed sculpture) at the Templo Mayor Museum.

Awards and fellowships
As an individual or leader of interdisciplinary teams, he has received several awards, among them:
The Salvador Novo Fellowship from the College of Mexico and the Mexican Writers Center (1985).
The Diario de México/CONACYT Medal for best student in Mexico (1991).
Eugene M. Kayden Humanities Book Award from the University of Colorado at Boulder (1991).
The Mexican Committee of Historical Sciences Prize for best article (1992, 1996, and 2007).
Choice Outstanding Academic Book (1994).
The Alfonso Caso Award from Mexico's National Institute of Anthropology and History (1998 and 2016, and honorable mention in 1991).
The Guggenheim Fellowship from the John Simon Guggenheim Memorial Foundation (2000).
Social Sciences Research Award from the Mexican Academy of Sciences (2000).
Dumbarton Oaks Research Fellowship, Harvard University (2005–2006).
Keynote Address at Convocation at the 2009 Annual Conference of the College Art Association (the only Latin American to receive this distinction in the association's history).
Senior Fellow, Pre-Columbian Studies, Dumbarton Oaks, Harvard University (2012–2014).
Research Fellowship, Institute for Advanced Studies of Paris (2013–2014).
Shanghai Archaeology Forum Research Award 2015, Chinese Academy of Social Sciences (his Great Temple Project is considered one of the ten best archaeological programs of the world in 2013–2015).
Medal of Merit, Festival del Centro Histórico de la Ciudad de México (2016).
Top 10 Discoveries of the Year of Archaeology Magazine, Archaeological Institute of America, 2017 and 2022.
Medal Fray Bernardino de Sahagún, Consejo Hidalguense de la Crónica and Gobierno del Estado de Hidalgo (2019).
Crónica Award 2019 in the field of culture.
Cátedra Latinoamericana “Julio Cortázar” 2023, University of Guadalajara.
Distinguished Lectures at Harvard, Stanford, Berkeley, Brown, Missouri, Arizona, Wellesley College, Dumbarton Oaks, Cambridge, the British Museum, the Musée du quai Branly, the De Young Museum, the San Antonio Museum of Art, The Library of Congress, the Académie des Inscriptions et Belles-Lettres,  the Shanghai Archaeology Forum, and the Gran Teatro Nacional del Perú.

As an integrant of interdisciplinary teams, he has received several collective awards, among them:
“Best Reference Source”, Library Journal (2001).
“Editor’s Choice”, Booklist (2001).
“Best Reference”, New York Public Library (2001).
“Outstanding Academic Title”, Choice: Current Reviews of Academic Books (2001 and 2017).
“1er Prix International du Livre d’Art Tribal”, Tribal Art Magazine (2009).
“Shanghai Archaeology Forum Field Discovery Award 2013” (Moon Pyramid Project, Teotihuacan), Chinese Academy of Social Sciences (2013).
“Annual Book Award”, Association for Latin American Art (2014).
“Prix Spécial du Jury”, 6e Festival International du Livre d’Art et du Film de Perpignan (2016).
“PROSE Award, Art Exhibitions Category”, Association of American Publishers (2018).
“The Best of Art of 2017”, The New York Times (2017).
“The Best of 2017”, Hyperallergic (2017).
“The Best of 2018”, The Washington Post (2018).
“AAMC Award for Excellence, Catalogue Award”, The Association of Art Museum Curators (2018).
“Bank Note of the Year (2021) Award”, International Bank Note Society (2022).

Published works

Books and essays (author)
La recuperación mexica del pasado teotihuacano, 1989.
Nómadas y sedentarios: el pasado prehispánico de Zacatecas, 1989.
The Offerings of the Templo Mayor of Tenochtitlan, 1993, 1994, 2005.
Xochicalco y Tula, with Robert H. Cobean and Guadalupe Mastache, 1995, 1996.
Mito y realidad de Zuyuá, with Alfredo López Austin, 1999, 2017.
Viaje al mercado de México, 2000, 2013.
Mexico's Indigenous Past, with Alfredo López Austin, 1996, 1998, 2001, 2012, 2014.
Aztèques. La collection de sculptures du Musée du quai Branly, with Marie-France Fauvet-Berthelot, 2005.
La Casa de las Águilas, 2 vols., 2006.
Tenochtitlan, with Judy Levin, 2006.
Breaking Through Mexico's Past, with Davíd Carrasco and Eduardo Matos Moctezuma, 2007, 2007.
Escultura monumental mexica, with Eduardo Matos Moctezuma, 2009, 2012, 2019.
Monte Sagrado/Templo Mayor: el cerro y la pirámide en la tradición religiosa mesoamericana, with Alfredo López Austin, 2009, 2012.
Tlaltecuhtli, 2010.
El capitán Guillermo Dupaix y su álbum arqueológico de 1794, 2015.
Arqueología de la arqueología: ensayos sobre los orígenes de la disciplina en México, 2017, 2019.
 Pretérito pluscuamperfecto: visiones mesoamericanas de los vestigios arqueológicos. Lección inaugural de El Colegio Nacional, 2019.
 Los primeros pasos de un largo trayecto: la ilustración de tema arqueológico en la Nueva España del siglo XVIII. Discurso de ingreso de la Academia Mexicana de la Historia, 2019.
 El ídolo sin pies ni cabeza: la Coatlicue a finales del México virreinal, 2020.
 El pasado imaginado: arqueología y artes plásticas en México (1440-1821), 2021.
 Los muertos viven, los vivos matan: Mictlantecuhtli y el Templo Mayor de Tenochtitlan, 2021.

Books, catalogs, and journals (editor) 
Atlas histórico de Mesoamérica, with Linda Manzanilla, 1989.
Historia antigua de México, 4 vols., with Linda Manzanilla, 1994–1995, 2000–2001, 2014.
Camino al Mictlan, with Vida Mercado, 1997.
La Casa de las Águilas: reconstrucción de un pasado, with Luis Barba, 2000.
Gli Aztechi tra passato e presente, with Alessandro Lupo and Luisa Migliorati, 2006.
Sacrificios de consagración en la Pirámide de la Luna, with Saburo Sugiyama, 2006.
Arqueología e historia del Centro de México. Homenaje a Eduardo Matos Moctezuma, with Davíd Carrasco and Lourdes Cué, 2006.
Moctezuma: Aztec Ruler, with Colin McEwan, 2009, 2010.
The Art of Urbanism: How Mesoamerican Kingdoms Represented Themselves in Architecture and Imagery, with William L. Fash, 2009, 2012.
El sacrificio humano en la tradición religiosa mesoamericana, with Guilhem Olivier, 2010.
Humo aromático para los dioses: una ofrenda de sahumadores al pie del Templo Mayor de Tenochtitlan, 2012, 2014.
El oro en Mesoamérica, special issue of Arqueología Mexicana, 2017.
Nuestra sangre, nuestro color: la escultura polícroma de Tenochtitlan, 2017.
Al pie del Templo Mayor de Tenochtitlan: estudios en honor de Eduardo Matos Moctezuma, with Ximena Chávez Balderas, 2 vols., 2019.
La arqueología ilustrada americana: la universalidad de una disciplina, with Jorge Maier Allende, 2021.
 Eduardo Matos Moctezuma: ochenta años, 2021.
 Los animales y el recinto sagrado de Tenochtitlan, with Eduardo Matos Moctezuma, 2022.

Notes

References
Leonardo López Luján, Curriculum vitae

External links
Leonardo López Luján, Mesoweb on-line publications
Works by Leonardo López Luján in libraries (WorldCat catalog)
 Leonardo López Luján with Alfredo López Luján: Publications, papers, and awards
Leonardo López Luján, "The Great Temple Project"
Leonardo López Luján, "El Proyecto Templo Mayor (1991-2017)"
Leonardo López Luján, Proyecto Templo Mayor's YouTube Channel, videos
 Leonardo López Luján, El Colegio Nacional's YouTube Channel, videos
Templo Mayor Museum, official site 
Mesoamerican Archive and Research Project, Harvard University
A.R. Williams, "Pyramid of Death", National Geographic Magazine, October 2006
Stefan Lovgren, "Aztec Temple found in Mexico City", National Geographic News, October 5, 2006
Johanna Tuckman, "Aztec Temple Found in Mexico City", American Archaeology, Summer 2008
Robert Draper, National Geographic Magazine, November 2010

1964 births
Living people
20th-century Mexican historians
Mexican archaeologists
Mexican anthropologists
21st-century Mexican historians
Mexican Mesoamericanists
Historians of Mesoamerica
Mesoamerican archaeologists
Aztec scholars
Teotihuacan scholars
20th-century archaeologists
21st-century archaeologists
20th-century Mesoamericanists
21st-century Mesoamericanists
Corresponding Fellows of the British Academy
Fellows of the Society of Antiquaries of London
Corresponding members of the Real Academia de la Historia
University of Paris alumni
Members of El Colegio Nacional (Mexico)
Members of the Académie des Inscriptions et Belles-Lettres